Trojans is the debut single of Australian alternative rock band Atlas Genius. It is from the extended plays Through the Glass and Trojans, and later appeared on their debut studio album When It Was Now (2013).

Charts

Weekly charts

Year-end charts

Certifications

References

External links
 .

2011 songs
2012 debut singles
Warner Records singles